Heinsberg is a town in North Rhine-Westphalia, Germany. It is the seat of the district Heinsberg. It is situated near the border with the Netherlands, on the river Wurm, approx. 20 km north-east of Sittard and 30 km south-west of Mönchengladbach.

Geography
Wassenberg is the town to the north of Heinsberg, Hückelhoven to the east, Waldfeucht and Gangelt to the west, and Geilenkirchen to the south. Two rivers flow through Heinsberg, the Wurm and the Rur. The Wurm flows into the Rur near to Rurkempen, a village of Heinsberg municipality.

History

Economy
Due to its proximity to the Benelux countries, sufficient industrial park areas, low trade tax and good traffic connections, Heinsberg has good prerequisites for development. Companies include: 
 Enka Gmbh & Co KG
 Hazet (tool company)
 Sera Aquaristic

Sights

The city of Heinsberg has just a few ancient structures. Most of the city was destroyed in 1944 during World War II. The main sights are:
 St. Gangolf church
 Castle ruins 
 Old district court
 Building assembly of Propstei, Torbogenhaus (former seat of the Amtmann of the Duchy of Jülich) and the former Haus Lennartz.

Transport

Railway
The railway from Heinsberg to Lindern, on the Aachen–Mönchengladbach railway, was reopened for passenger traffic in December 2013. Passenger traffic had been suspended in 1980. , there is an hourly service from Heinsberg station to Lindern, which continues to Aachen Hbf.

Bus
The main bus station of Heinsberg is next to the train station. It is served by buses to several towns and villages in the district, including Erkelenz, Geilenkirchen, Wegberg, Gangelt, Waldfeucht and Selfkant-Tüddern. There is one swift bus, the SB 1 from Erkelenz to Geilenkirchen via Heinsberg.

Road
Heinsberg has two exits on the motorway A46 to Düsseldorf. The Bundesstraße 221 (Alsdorf–Straelen) passes through the town.

Public facilities
 office of the district Heinsberg
 police (district)
 the district court
 health office
 jail

Education and training 
Heinsberg possesses many elementary schools and kindergartens. The secondary education facilities include a high school (Gymnasium). Since 2007 there is a school for disabled persons in the building of the former vocational school (Berufsschule).

Media
 Heinsberger newspaper
 Hs-Woche, a free weekly newspaper
 "Lokalzeit aus Aachen", a news broadcast from the WDR about Aachen and also Heinsberg
 HS TV, a television transmitter
 The radio transmitter Welle West was closed in 2007. Other radio stations, which include 100.5 and 107.8, provide news and weather reports for Heinsberg.

Heinsberg COVID-19 study
Heinsberg was an early centre for the COVID19 pandemic and was selected for an intensive study of the disease and its transmission characteristics in lateMarch 2020.

Twin towns – sister cities

Heinsberg is twinned with:
 Ozimek, Poland

References

External links

 Official site 

Heinsberg (district)
Districts of the Rhine Province